Mystery Land is an EP by Y-Traxx. Released in 1997, it charted at #63 on the UK Singles Chart.

Track listing

References

1995 EPs